There have been three baronetcies created for persons with the surname Leith, one in the Baronetage of Great Britain and two in the Baronetage of the United Kingdom.

The Leith Baronetcy, of Newcastle upon Tyne, was created on 12 September 1919 for Alexander Leith. The title became extinct on his death on 9 November 1956.

Leith, later Leith-Buchanan baronets (1775)
see Leith-Buchanan baronets

Leith baronets, of Fyvie (1923)
see Forbes-Leith baronets

Leith baronets, of Newcastle upon Tyne (1919)
 Sir Alexander Leith, 1st Baronet (1869-1956)

References
 Archaeologia Aeliana, or Miscellaneous Tracts Relating to Antiquity Ed CH Hunter Blair. Society of Antiquarians Newcastle upon Tyne 1943 p 64
 

Baronetcies in the Baronetage of Great Britain
Extinct baronetcies in the Baronetage of the United Kingdom
Baronetcies in the Baronetage of the United Kingdom